Chestnut or castaneous is a colour, a medium reddish shade of brown (displayed right), and is named after the nut of the chestnut tree.  An alternate name for the colour is badious.
 
Indian red is a similar but separate and distinct colour from chestnut. 

Chestnut is also a very dark tan that almost appears brown.

Etymology
 
The name chestnut derives from the color of the nut of the chestnut tree.
The first recorded use of chestnut as a color term in English was in 1555. The color maroon is also named after the chestnut (via French marron).

Variations of chestnut

Deep chestnut

Deep chestnut is the color called chestnut in Crayola crayons.  This colour was also produced in a special limited edition in which it was called Vermont maple syrup. 

At the request of educators worried that children (mistakenly) believed the name represented the skin colour of Native Americans, Crayola changed the name of their crayon colour "Indian Red", originally formulated in 1958, to "Chestnut" in 1999. In reality, the colour Indian red has nothing to do with American Indians but is an iron oxide pigment the use of which is popular in India.

Chestnut in nature

 The chestnut-coloured woodpecker
 The chestnut-backed chickadee
 The coat of the bongo

Chestnut in human culture
Animal husbandry
 Chestnut is a coat colour of horses.

Cosmetology
 Brown chestnut hair is a human hair colour.

See also

List of colours
Chestnut (coat)—chestnut-coated horses

References

Bird colours
Shades of red
Shades of brown